Bernard Haisch is a German-born American astrophysicist who has done research in solar-stellar astrophysics and stochastic electrodynamics. He has developed with Alfonso Rueda a speculative theory that the non-zero lowest energy state of the vacuum, as predicted by quantum mechanics, might provide a physical explanation for the origin of inertia, and might someday be used for spacecraft propulsion. Haisch has advocated the serious scientific study of phenomena outside the traditional scope of science and is known for his interest in the UFO phenomenon as well as a variety of other unorthodox topics.

Since 2002 Haisch has been involved with ManyOne Networks and related Digital Universe projects which aim to produce, among other things, a multimedia online encyclopedia. In 2006 Haisch published a popular book in which he attempted to reconcile modern scientific belief with traditional religious belief. He attributes his spiritual interests to his educational experience at the Latin School of Indianapolis (a high school affiliated with the Roman Catholic Church), and at the St. Meinrad Seminary and Archabbey.

Scientific career

Haisch was born in Stuttgart, Germany and earned a Ph.D. in Astronomy from the University of Wisconsin–Madison in 1975 and thereafter spent three years as a postdoctoral fellow at the Joint Institute for Laboratory Astrophysics at the University of Colorado in Boulder, Colorado.

Haisch has worked at the Solar & Astrophysics Laboratory at Lockheed Martin in Palo Alto, California and served as deputy director of the Center for Extreme Ultraviolet Astrophysics Laboratory at the University of California, Berkeley. He has been a visiting scientist at the Max Planck Institute for Extraterrestrial Physics in Garching, Germany and at the University of Utrecht in the Netherlands. His main research from the mid 1970s until the late 1990s was high energy astrophysics, and specifically the ultraviolet and X-ray emissions from coronae and flares on the Sun and other late-type stars.

Haisch has published more than one hundred research papers on a variety of topics, many in prestigious journals such as Nature, Science, Physical Review, Astrophysical Journal, and Annalen der Physik. He also served for ten years as an editor of the Astrophysical Journal.

The Quantum Vacuum and the Principle of Inertia

In an extensive series of papers, Haisch and Alfonso Rueda, a physicist currently teaching in the Department of Electrical Engineering, California State University, Long Beach, California, have developed a controversial hypothesis in the context of stochastic electrodynamics. In his recent mainstream non-academic book (see section below), Haisch has summarized this "quantum vacuum inertia" hypothesis as follows:

This assertion, that accelerated observers experience a force due to the zero-point field, and that this "electromagnetic reaction force" is responsible for the inertia of material objects, rests upon a computation in which Haisch and Rueda have computed a nonzero "zero point field Poynting vector". (See the 1998 Foundations of Physics paper cited below.)

Computations by other physicists, such as Bill Unruh, apparently contradict this result. The mainstream view is that the zero point field does not give rise to a physical force on observers accelerating with respect to "the vacuum". However, it is known classically that without the zero point field the spin state of all matter would collapse inward almost instantaneously.

Non-mainstream publications

Haisch is a former editor of the Journal of Scientific Exploration, which publishes papers on "topics outside the established disciplines of mainstream science" such as paranormal effects, the UFO phenomenon, and cryptids.

In addition to papers in mainstream journals and conference proceedings, Haisch has also published papers in Science & Spirit magazine and the Journal of Noetic Sciences, a parapsychological journal published by the Institute of Noetic Sciences.

Other ventures

California Institute for Physics and Astrophysics

In 1999 Haisch founded the California Institute for Physics and Astrophysics in Palo Alto, California, an organization mainly devoted to the study of the electromagnetic quantum vacuum and funded by private philanthropic money. The institute formerly employed five full-time physicists doing research on string theory, general relativity and stochastic electrodynamics. Haisch served as the institute's director from 1999 until 2002.

UFO Skeptic

Haisch has also created a website called UFO Skeptic, which promotes the investigation of the UFO phenomenon by professional scientists.

The God Theory

In 2006, Haisch published a book entitled The God Theory, in which he writes

Haisch published a follow-up in 2010, 'Purpose Guided Universe'. Both books reject both atheism and traditional theistic viewpoints, favoring instead a model of Pandeism wherein our Creator has become our Universe, to share in the actualized experiences therein manifested.  Haisch provides as proof of his views a combination of fine tuning and mystical experiences arguments.

Digital Universe

In 2002 Haisch became Chief Science Officer of ManyOne Networks. Since 2004 he also served as president of the now defunct Digital Universe Foundation, which, among other things, aimed to create a peer-reviewed alternative to English Wikipedia, seeking to provide a comprehensive and reliable account of current mainstream scientific theory, evidence, and belief.

Publications

Book website

Selected mainstream papers by Bernard Haisch on astrophysics:
 
 
 

A few representative publications regarding the proposed physical origin of inertia as an electromagnetic drag force and hypothetical spacecraft propulsion schemes:

 eprint version from UFO Skeptic, Haisch's website devoted to encouraging genuinely objective and scientific inquiry into matters related to the UFO phenomenon.

References

External links

Biography in French of Dr. Bernard Haisch

21st-century American physicists
American astrophysicists
Living people
Year of birth missing (living people)
Ufologists
Place of birth missing (living people)
German deists
American deists
Philosophical cosmologists